Tubbs Branch is a  long 2nd order tributary to Deep Creek in Sussex County, Delaware.

Course
Tubbs Branch is formed at the confluence of Cool Branch and Graham Branch about 0.5 miles south of Concord, Delaware, and then flows north to join Deep Creek at Concord.

Watershed
Tubbs Branch drains  of area, receives about 45.0 in/year of precipitation, has a wetness index of 656.78, and is about 8% forested.

See also
List of rivers of Delaware

References

Rivers of Delaware
Rivers of Sussex County, Delaware